Larousse can refer to:

Éditions Larousse, a French publishing house founded by Pierre Larousse
some of its publications
Grand Larousse encyclopédique, 1960–1964 encyclopedia
Larousse Encyclopedia of Mythology
Larousse Gastronomique
Petit Larousse (1905)
 Grand dictionnaire universel du XIXe siècle, 1866–1876 encyclopedia, the first Larousse
 Nouveau Larousse illustré, 1897–1904 encyclopedia
 Grand Dictionnaire Encyclopédique Larousse, 1982–1985 dictionary and encyclopedia
 Pierre Larousse (1817–1875) French grammarian, lexicographer, encyclopedist

See also
Professor Larousse (1920 film) silent German crime drama
Larrousse, former F1 team
Gérard Larrousse (born 1940) French motorsports figure
Rousse, Bulgaria
Rousses, France; a commune in Lozère 
La Rousse, Monaco; the northernmost ward of Monaco
Les Rousses, France; a commune in Bourgogne-Franche-Comté

French-language surnames